Lisarow is a suburb of the Central Coast region of New South Wales, Australia, located  north-northeast of Gosford's central business district via the Pacific Highway. It is part of the  local government area.

The area was largely rural until urban encroachment in more recent decades. It is now a mainly residential area, composed of medium-density housing, with small rural properties on the fringes. There is also a substantial amount of industrial activity around the railway line and station.

Educational facilities in the suburb include Lisarow High School, Lisarow Primary School and Narara Public School.

The Test cricketer, Alan Davidson, hails from the town. Lisarow shares the largest cricket club on the Central Coast with Ourimbah, their club mascot is the magpie.

References

Suburbs of the Central Coast (New South Wales)